Niikappu Dam  is a rockfill dam located in Hokkaido Prefecture in Japan. The dam is used for power production. The catchment area of the dam is 309.9 km2. The dam impounds about 435  ha of land when full and can store 145000 thousand cubic meters of water. The construction of the dam was started on 1970 and completed in 1974.

References

Dams in Hokkaido